The World's Fair Marina is a public marina in Flushing Bay, Queens, New York. It is operated by the Marine Division of the Department of Parks and Recreation.

Overview
The ferry landing is currently used by SeaStreak, which provides service to Highlands, New Jersey for selected New York Mets games. Several party and event boats operate cruises from the marina. A free ferry operated by New York Water Taxi provides service between Pier 11/Wall Street and the East 34th Street Ferry Landing in Manhattan and the World's Fair Marina, for the US Open and before Mets games.

The parking lot is next to the Grand Central Parkway. The marina's administration building constructed for the 1964 World's Fair now houses the New York City Department of Parks & Recreation Marine Division office and the World's Fair Marina Restaurant & Banquet Hall.

History
A boat basin was constructed for the 1939 New York World's Fair. Robert Moses had the marina redesigned and expanded to accommodate 800 boats for the 1964 New York World's Fair, which was held in the same location.

Ferry service to baseball games began in 1989 with American Skimmer providing service between Pier 11/Wall Street and the East 34th Street Ferry Landing in Manhattan. NY Waterway later began operating a similar ferry service in 1998.

The Parks Department has run the marina since 1999. Previously, it had been run by a private concessionaire.

References

External links
 World's Fair Marina

1964 New York World's Fair
East River
Geography of Queens, New York
Port of New York and New Jersey
Flushing Meadows–Corona Park